Gertjan Willem Vlieghe (born May 1971) is a British-Belgian economist.

Early life
Gertjan Willem Vlieghe was born in Belgium in May 1971, and received a PhD from the London School of Economics.

Career
Vlieghe was an economic assistant to Mervyn King at the Bank of England. He then worked as a bond strategist and director at the Deutsche Bank. Later, he worked as a senior economist at Brevan Howard, a hedge fund based in London.

In July 2015, it was announced that he would replace David Miles in September 2015 as an "external member", bringing in expertise from outside the Bank, in the nine-member Monetary Policy Committee (MPC) of the Bank of England.

Vlieghe was hired as an economic advisor to the Chancellor Jeremy Hunt in 2022.

References

External links 
 Bank of England biography Dr Gertjan Vlieghe

1971 births
Alumni of the London School of Economics
Belgian economists
British economists
Living people
Belgian emigrants to the United Kingdom
Bankers from London